The Toronto Ultra is a Canadian professional Call of Duty League (CDL) esports team based in Toronto. Toronto Ultra is owned by OverActive Media. Toronto was announced as one of the first five cities to host a CDL team. According to ESPN, the publisher was looking to sell slots for approximately $25 million per team.

Current roster

References

External links
 

Venture capital-funded esports teams
Call of Duty League teams
Esports teams established in 2019